Cristiano Banti (4 January 1824 – 4 December 1904) was an Italian genre and landscape painter. He was a leading figure in the Macchiaioli movement of Tuscany.

Biography 
Banti was born into a middle-class family in Santa Croce sull'Arno. At this time, he worked in the Neo-Classical style and produced what is perhaps his best-known work, Galileo Facing the Inquisition.

In 1854, he moved to Florence and became an habitué of the Caffè Michelangiolo, an important meeting place for local artists. It was here that he had his introduction to the Macchiaioli movement. His conversion to the movement's aesthetic ideals was such that he sought to have "Galileo" removed from display because he had "dishonored art without knowing it".

After that, he became determined to produce paintings that would capture the natural effect of sunlight, going on many long outdoor excursions with his associates; especially Telemaco Signorini, who had a great influence on him.

In 1861, he went to Paris to study with Constant Troyon and Camille Corot, then settled in Castelfranco di Sopra to continue his nature studies. Perpetually dissatisfied with his work, he rarely exhibited. In 1870, he was part of the jury at the "Esposizione Nazionale di Parma" and had a falling out with Signorini. Five years later he returned to Paris, then went to London in 1879 to familiarize himself with English art.

Divisions between him and the other Macchiaioli became deeper and he was often criticized, so he retired to his family's villa near Castelfiorentino. Following the death of his wife, he moved to Montemurlo, where he spent most of his time collecting art—often from the Macchiaioli, with whom he had become largely reconciled. Occasionally, he would even provide them with a place to stay.

Although still shy of public recognition, he accepted an appointment as Professor at the Academy of Fine Arts and served on the commission charged with reorganizing the Uffizi. In 1887, he was back in London, studying the Old Masters at the National Gallery and making the acquaintance of James McNeill Whistler.

Banti fathered at least eight children, at least one of whom is known to have settled in England. He died at his villa in Montemurlo in 1904. Ten years later, his collection was sold at auction and dispersed.

Selected paintings

References

Further reading 
 Giuliano Matteucci, Cristiano Banti: un macchiaiolo nel suo tempo, 1824-1904 (exhibition catalog), Il Museo di Milano, 1982
 Lucia Bassignana, Cristiano Banti (1824-1904): arte, inquietudini e affetti di un pittore dalla campagna toscana all'Europa, Comune di Montemurlo, 2014

External links 

Arcadja Auctions: More works by Banti

1824 births
1904 deaths
19th-century Italian painters
Italian male painters
People from Santa Croce sull'Arno
Painters from Tuscany
Italian genre painters
Academic staff of the Accademia di Belle Arti di Firenze
19th-century Italian male artists